Kayode Olatukombo Ayeni (born 27 July 1987) is an American professional basketball player who currently plays for the MAS Fes club of the Nationale 1, the first division of professional basketball in Morocco.

Before he joined MAS Fes, he played for the Al Wakrah club of the Qatari Basketball League.

References

External links
St. Francis Bio
Asia-basket.com Profile
 

1987 births
Living people
American expatriate basketball people in Qatar
American men's basketball players
American sportspeople of Nigerian descent
ABA All-Star Game players
Basketball players from New York City
Forwards (basketball)
Sportspeople from Brooklyn
St. Francis Brooklyn Terriers men's basketball players